Gandersheim can refer to either:

 Gandersheim Abbey, convent in Lower Saxony (9th century-1810)
 Bad Gandersheim, town in Lower Saxony, called Gandersheim until 1931